Bryan Collier (born 1967) is an American writer and illustrator known best for illustrating children's books. He won both the Coretta Scott King Award, as illustrator, and the Ezra Jack Keats New Illustrator Award for Uptown (Holt, 2000), the first book he both wrote and illustrated. He has won six King Awards as illustrator and he is a four-time Caldecott honor recipient.

For his lifetime contribution as a children's illustrator, Collier is U.S. nominee for the biennial, international Hans Christian Andersen Award in 2014.

Biography 

Bryan Collier was raised in Pocomoke City near the southern border of Maryland Eastern Shore. As a child he had a great collection of quality children's books that his mom, a Head Start teacher, would bring home. Some of his favorites were, Whistle for Willie by Ezra Jack Keats, Snowy Day by Keats, Harold and the Purple Crayon by Crockett Johnson, and Where the Wild Things Are by Maurice Sendak. He said that he wouldn't read the books at first; he would only look at the images to tell him the story.

Collier started working with watercolors and photo collage when he was 15 years old.  He said it was something that sort of clicked in him overnight and the next day he starting painting.
	
While in high school he won first place in a Congressional Competition and his painting was displayed in the Capitol Building in Washington D.C. for a year.
	
Collier received a scholarship through a national talent competition through the Pratt Institute in New York City, one of the leading art schools in the United States. He later graduated from Pratt with honors.
	
While at Pratt, he was a volunteer at the Harlem Horizon Art Studio located within the Harlem Hospital Center.  The center is open to the children of the hospital as well as the children of the community. He later became the Program Director, a position he held for twelve years.

Collier said that one of the biggest reasons for wanting to become a part of children's books was because of an experience he had in 1995 at a book store where the books he saw did not look or feel or sound like him or his children.  He thought that he could do better, so that's what he worked towards.

Today Collier continues to be active at the Harlem Horizon Art Studio but now as a volunteer. He believes it's important to be a positive role model for kids. He says, "It gives the community, the schools, the kids, and the parents the opportunity to come together for a very positive uplifting cause—the building and re-building of self-esteem, teaching the appreciation of art, and keeping the kids connected and involved and away from negative influences." He also spends time visiting schools to talk with teachers, librarians, and students about books and art.

Illustration style

Collier uses a unique technique of combining watercolors with collage.

The first thing he does before creating the illustrations is a photo shoot of either his family or friends acting out the story. Sometimes he uses up to ten rolls of film. He believes that by having people act out the story, it shows him the important gestures that illuminate the scenes.

Next, he carefully selects some of the photographs that best fit the text and begins sketching. After the sketching is complete, he begins painting in watercolor and the collage follows.  He gets pieces for his collage mostly from magazines like Elle.

Awards 

Collier is a four-time recipient of a Caldecott Honor: Martin's Big Words, Rosa, Dave the Potter, and Trombone Shorty. Those four books are among nine for which Collier has received Coretta Scott King Award recognition as the winner or honor recipient. The annual King Awards, one for an illustrator and one for a writer, recognize the year's "most distinguished portrayal of African American experience in literature for children or teens".

Coretta Scott King Award, Illustrator, winner or honor recipient (9):
 2001 Uptown by Bryan Collier
 2001 honor recipient, Freedom River by Doreen Rappaport
 2002 honor recipient, Martin's Big Words: The Life of Martin Luther King, Jr. by Doreen Rappaport
 2003 honor recipient, Visiting Langston by Willie Perdomo
 2006 Rosa by Nikki Giovanni
 2011 Dave the Potter: Artist, Poet, Slave by Laban Carrick Hill
 2013 I, Too, Am America by Langston Hughes 
 2014 Knock Knock: My Dad's Dream for Me, written by Daniel Beaty
 2016 Trombone Shorty, written by Troy Andrews and Bill Taylor

For Uptown (Henry Holt, 2000), which he also wrote, Collier won the Ezra Jack Keats New Illustrator Award.

Books illustrated 
My Country, 'Tis of Thee, written by Claire Rudolf Murphy, 2014
Knock Knock: My Dad's Dream for Mewritten by Daniel Beaty, 2013
Fifty Cents and a Dream: Young Booker T. Washington (written by Jabari Asim), 2012
 I, Too, Am America by Langston Hughes, 2012
Dave the Potter: Artist, Poet, Slave by Laban Carrick Hill, 2011
Your Moon, My Moon: to a Faraway Child (written by Patricia MacLachlan), Simon & Schuster, 2011
Dave the Potter: Artist, Poet, Slave (written by Laban Carrick Hill), Little, Brown 2010 
Doo-Wop Pop (written by Roni Schotter), Amistad, 2008
Lincoln and Douglass: An American Friendship (written by Nikki Giovanni), Henry Holt and Co., 2008
Barack Obama: Son of a Promise, Child of Hope (written by Nikki Grimes), Simon & Schuster, 2008
Lift Every Voice and Sing (written by James Weldon Johnson), Amistad, 2007
Cherish Today: A Celebration of Life's Moments (written by Kristina Evans), Jump at the Sun, 2007
12 Rounds to Glory: The Story of Muhammad Ali (written by Charles R. Jr Smith), Candlewick 2007
Welcome, Precious (written by Nikki Grimes), Orchard Books / a division of Scholastic Press, 2006
Rosa (written by Nikki Giovanni), Henry Holt and Company, 2005
John's Secret Dreams: The Life of John Lennon (written by Doreen Rappaport),Jump at the Sun / Hyperion Books for Children, 2004
Skull Talks Back and Other Haunting Tales (written by Zora Neale Hurston),HarperCollins Publishers, 2004
What's the Hurry Fox?: And Other Animal Stories (collected by Zora Neale Hurston; adapted by Joyce Carol Thomas), HarperCollins Publishers, 2004
I'm Your Child, God: Prayers for Children and Teenagers (written by Marian Wright Edelman), Jump at the Sun / Hyperion Books for Children, 2002
Kiss it Up to God (selected poems by Nadine Mozon), Fly By Night Press, 2002
Visiting Langston(written by Willie Perdomo), Henry Holt and Company, 2002
Jump at the Sun Treasury: An African American Picture Book Collection (an anthology compiled by Andrea Davis Pinkney), Jump at the Sun / Hyperion Books for Children, 2001
Martin's Big Words: The Life of Dr. Martin Luther King, Jr. (written by Doreen Rappaport), Jump at the Sun / Hyperion Books for Children, 2001
A Freedom River (written by Doreen Rappaport), Jump at the Sun / Hyperion Books for Children, 2000
Uptown (written by Bryan Collier), Henry Holt and Company, 2000
These Hands (written by Hope Lynn Price), Hyperion Books for Children, 1999

See also

References

External links
 
 Meet the Authors and Illustrators: Bryan Collier at RIF Reading Planet
 Biography: Bryan Collier at publisher Scholastic
 https://web.archive.org/web/20060901121801/http://bccb.lis.uiuc.edu/1002focus.html 
 Bryan Collier Author Program In-depth Interview at TeachingBooks (2001)
 

American illustrators
American children's writers
African-American writers
African-American illustrators
People from Pocomoke City, Maryland
Living people
Date of birth missing (living people)
Place of birth missing (living people)
1967 births
21st-century African-American people
20th-century African-American people